Robert Rosenthal (born March 2, 1933) is a German-born American psychologist who is a Distinguished Professor of Psychology at the University of California, Riverside. His interests include  self-fulfilling prophecies, which he explored in a well-known study of the Pygmalion effect: the effect of teachers' expectations on students.

Biography
Rosenthal was born in Gießen, Hesse, on March 2, 1933, and left Germany with his family at the age of six. In 1956, he was awarded a PhD by the University of California, Los Angeles. He started his career as a clinical psychologist and then moved into social psychology. From 1962 to 1999 he taught at Harvard, became chairman of the psychology department there in 1992, and Edgar Pierce Professor of Psychology in 1995. On retiring from Harvard in 1999, he went to California.

Much of his work has focused on nonverbal communication, particularly its influence on expectations: for example, in doctor-patient or manager-employee situations. The many awards he has won include the 2003 Gold Medal Award for Life Achievement in the Science of Psychology from the American Psychological Association and election to the American Academy of Arts and Sciences. Rosenthal won the AAAS Prize for Behavioral Science Research in 1960. In 2008 he became a University Professor in the University of California statewide system. A survey in the Review of General Psychology, published in 2002, ranked Rosenthal as the 84th most cited psychologist of the 20th century.

Publications

 Rosenthal, R. & Jacobson, L. (1992). Pygmalion in the classroom, Expanded edition. New York: Irvington.

References

Sources
University Biography
American Psychological Foundation
List of Rosenthal's appointments, awards etc.

1933 births
German emigrants to the United States
University of California, Riverside faculty
University of California, Los Angeles alumni
Harvard University faculty
Social psychologists
Living people
21st-century American psychologists
20th-century American psychologists